1990 in professional wrestling describes the year's events in the world of professional wrestling.

List of notable promotions 
These promotions held notable shows in 1990.

Calendar of notable shows

Notable events
 January 1 – The CWA merges with the United States Wrestling Association
 May 5 – Two World title matches was held at a AWA Twin Wars '90 live event where Larry Zbyszko defeated Nikita Koloff to retain the AWA World Heavyweight title and NWA World Heavyweight Champion Ric Flair defeated Brian Pillman
 July 16- The Road Warriors and "The Texas Tornado" Kerry Von Erich made their WWF debuts at a WWF Wrestling Challenge TV taping.
 August 12 – The AWA hosts their Team Challenge Series final and two title changes were taped with Buck Zumhoff defeating Jonnie Stewart for the reactivated AWA Light Heavyweight title and The Trooper and D.J. Peterson defeating the Destruction Crew for the AWA World Tag Team titles at their final TV taping in Rochester, MN
 August 26 – The Herb Abrams version of the Universal Wrestling Federation (Herb Abrams) was launched at a Wrestling fans convention in New York, NY
 November 22 – The Undertaker and The Gobbledy Gooker (Héctor Guerrero) debut at WWF Survivor Series
 November 23 – World Class Championship Wrestling (WCCW) held its final show.
 December 1 – WCW drops the NWA brand from their TV shows and championships.

Accomplishments and tournaments

WCW

WWF

Awards and honors

Pro Wrestling Illustrated

Wrestling Observer Newsletter

Title changes

WWF

Debuts
Uncertain debut date
Bill DeMott
Sweet Saraya
Debbie Malenko 
Ray González
Marc Mero 
The Gambler (wrestler)
 January 13 – Tatanka
 May 19 – El Gigante
 September 21 – Tomoko Watanabe
 October 2 – Chris Jericho
 November 1 – Mikiko Futagami

Retirements
 Otto Wanz (1968–1990)
 Frenchy Martin (1971–1990)
 Ann Casey (1962–1990)
 Nick Kiniski (1985–1990)
 Ole Anderson (1967–1990)
 Ray Candy (1973–1990)
 Raymond Rougeau (1971–1990)
 Ron Hutchison (1983–1990)
 Scott Casey (1970–1990)
 Seiji Sakaguchi (August 5, 1967 – March 15, 1990)
 Soldat Ustinov (1985-October 25, 1990) 
 Uncle Elmer (1960–1990)
 Lou Thesz (1932–December 26, 1990) 
 Les Thornton (1957–1990)

Births
January 7 - Jack Gallagher 
January 14 – Kacy Catanzaro, American female wrestler
January 23 - Alex Silva, Canadian wrestler 
March 6 – Demitrius Bronson, American wrestler
March 7 – Chase Owens, American wrestler
March 15 - Jordan Devlin 
March 24 – Lacey Evans, American female wrestler
April 2 – Sawyer Fulton, American wrestler
April 30 – Tomahawk T.T., Japanese wrestler
May 1 - Ace Romero 
May 2 - Mahabali Shera 
May 25 – Bo Dallas
June 27 – Kimber Lee
July 6 – Puma, Mexican luchador
July 8 – Axel Dieter Jr.
July 18
Golden Magic, Mexican luchador
Mandy Rose, American female wrestler
July 21 – Fabian Aichner, Italian wrestler
July 24 – Angelo Dawkins, American wrestler
July 24 – Tucker Knight
August 8 - Zack Gibson, English wrestler 
August 15 – Diamante, American female wrestler
August 17 - Danhausen 
September 15 – Titán, Mexican luchador
September 18 – Herodes Jr., Mexican luchador
September 26 – Eterno, Mexican luchador
September 30 - Isaiah Swerve Scott 
October 2 - Barbi Hayden 
October 14 – Raquel Diaz, American retired professional wrestler 
October 17 – Mahabali Shera, Indian wrestler
November 9 – Robin, Mexican luchador
December 27 – Zelina Vega, American female wrestler
December 30 – Fenix, Mexican luchador enmascarado

Deaths
 January 7 – Bronko Nagurski, American football player and wrestler (born 1908)
 February 4 – Whipper Billy Watson, Canadian wrestler (born 1915)
 February - Frank Sexton (born 1914) 
 March 2 – Ivan Gomes (born 1939) 
 April 18 – Gory Guerrero, American wrestler (born 1921)
 July 7 - Chief Little Eagle, American wrestler (born 1935)  
 August 15 – Pat O'Connor, New Zealand wrestler (born 1924)
 August 31 – Bert Assirati, British wrestler (born 1908)
 November 21 – Dean Hart, Canadian music promoter and wrestling referee (born 1954)
 December 9 – Mike Mazurki, American actor and wrestler (born 1907)
 December 31 – Ed Gantner, American wrestler (born 1959)

See also
List of WCW pay-per-view events
List of WWF pay-per-view events
List of FMW supercards and pay-per-view events

References

 
professional wrestling